Scott Helland is an American alternative rock musician, acoustic guitarist, bassist and songwriter. A founding member of the groups Deep Wound, Outpatients, and Frenchy and the Punk. He also performs instrumental music as Guitarmy of One. Helland was born in Centralia, Illinois and raised in Westfield, Massachusetts.

Career
Helland attended high school in Westfield, where he met Lou Barlow. The two formed the Massachusetts-based hardcore punk band Deep Wound in 1982. J Mascis joined the band after answering their ad for a "drummer wanted to play really fast". While playing bass guitar in Deep Wound, Helland formed Outpatients with brother Vis Helland in 1982 and released The Basement Tape in 1983. The Outpatients were also part of the Western mass hardcore scene and shared the stage with bands like Hüsker Dü, Battalion of Saints, Crucifix, The FU's and GBH. Deep Wound broke up in 1984 and "Scott... went in the Outpatients full time." The Outpatients toured the East Coast of the US, Canada and Argentina throughout their 13-year career and disbanded in 1995.

Helland released seven albums under his own name beginning with the experimental Hellbox Mood Rings CD in 1996. In 2000, he released an ambient/instrumental/new age CD called Space Age Tranceology "and made the striking transition to atmospheric soundtracks." In the same year he composed music for the film Riders. Songs from his 2002 CD release, Earthbound, were played on the syndicated radio program Echoes. In 2006, he released the all acoustic 12 song Catapult album with his tribute to the BBC series of the same name Monarch of the Glen. He formed Scott Helland and the Traveling Band of Gypsy Nomads in 2005 with French-born singer and percussionist Samantha Stephenson, which later became Frenchy and the Punk.

In 2004, Helland reunited with his old Deep Wound bandmates for a song at the John M Greene Hall in Northampton, Massachusetts. In June 2013 they reunited, to perform the song "Training Ground" at the Governor's Ball in New York City. More recently Helland and his bandmates played together in 2018 at Fenway Park in Boston, Massachusetts when the other half of Deep Wound, J Mascis and Lou Barlow's band Dinosaur jr were opening for the Foo Fighters.   

In 2014 his duo Frenchy and the Punk performed at Scotland's prestigious Edinburgh Fringe Fest. In 2016 he released a book of his pen and ink drawings titled Feast. "Helland’s pagan-organic lines recall the gothic style of Aubrey Beardsley, as well as those of punk pen wielders like Savage Pencil, Nick Blinko, and Raymond Pettibon."

Helland returned to the instrumental rock world with his Never End the Rocket Century record in 2017. Intended as a multicultural mashup of the classic Ramones albums Rocket to Russia and End of the Century, his acoustic (guitar) has the propulsive drive of punk rock, but his riffs resonate with sounds ranging from Krautrock to flamenco and spaghetti western pastiche. Helland has released 6 videos from the album including the title track, 'Never End the Rocket Century', in which he donned a space suit and walked around Los Angeles.

In January 2019 Helland and Stephenson's cabaret rock duo Frenchy and the Punk released a video for the song Lanky Bell Bottoms from their forth-coming album Hooray Beret.

Helland released the all instrumental spy themed album 'The Spy Detective Collective' in 2021. The music journalist Justin Vellucci from Pop Matters says "Helland has tapped into something interesting and, dare we say magical on The Spy Detective Collective."

Discography
See also Deep Wound

Albums

Featured in compilations
Bands That Could Be God LP (1984 – Deep Wound and Outpatients)
Flipside Vinyl Fanzine Vol 2 LP (1985 – Outpatients)
Guillotined at the Hangar: Shielded by Death, Vol. 2 (2002 – Outpatients)

References

External links
 Scott Helland's website
 Official Frenchy and the Punk website
 Scott Helland and Frenchy and the Punk
 Interview with Scott Helland and Frenchy and the Punk October 2012

American rock guitarists
American male guitarists
Guitarists from Massachusetts
Living people
1967 births
20th-century American guitarists
20th-century American male musicians